The 1916 United States elections elected the members of the 65th United States Congress. The election occurred during the Fourth Party System, six months before the United States entered World War I. Unlike 1912, the Democrats did not benefit from a split in the Republican Party, but the Democrats still retained the Presidency and the majority in the Senate. Democrats lost the majority in the House, but retained control of the chamber.

Democratic President Woodrow Wilson defeated the Republican nominee, former Supreme Court Justice Charles Evans Hughes, in the presidential election. Hughes won the Republican nomination on the third ballot of the 1916 Republican National Convention, defeating several other candidates. Republicans won several Northern states, but Wilson's success in the rest of the country gave him a small margin in the electoral college and the popular vote. Wilson's win made him the first sitting Democratic President to win re-election since Andrew Jackson. Wilson's running mate, Thomas R. Marshall, was the first sitting Vice President to win re-election since John C. Calhoun.

Republicans made moderate gains in the House, gaining a narrow plurality. However, Democrat Champ Clark won re-election as Speaker of the House.

In the second Senate election since the ratification of the 17th Amendment, Republicans made minor gains, but Democrats retained a solid majority.

See also
1916 United States presidential election
1916 United States House of Representatives elections
1916 United States Senate elections
1916 United States gubernatorial elections

References

1916 elections in the United States
1916